Ensuring adequate energy supply to sustain economic growth has been a core concern of the Chinese government since 1949.  The country is the world's largest emitter of greenhouse gases, and coal in China is a major cause of global warming. However, from 2010 to 2015 China reduced energy consumption per unit of GDP by 18%, and  emissions per unit of GDP by 20%. On a per-capita basis, it was the world's 51st largest emitter of greenhouse gases in 2016. China is also the world's largest renewable energy producer.  China is the largest producer of hydroelectricity, solar power and wind power in the world. The energy policy of China is connected to its industrial policy. The goals of China's industrial policy dictate its energy needs.   

Details for the power sector are likely to be released winter 2021/22 for the 14th five-year plan, and this is expected to determine whether the country builds more coal-fired power stations, and therefore whether global climate goals are likely to be met.

Summary

Environment and carbon emissions

On June 19, 2007, the Netherlands Environmental Assessment Agency announced that a preliminary study had indicated that China's greenhouse gas emissions for 2006 had exceeded those of the United States for the first time. The agency calculated that China's  emissions from fossil fuels increased by 9% in 2006, while those of the United States fell by 1.4%, compared to 2005. The study used energy and cement production data from British Petroleum which they believed to be 'reasonably accurate', while warning that statistics for rapidly changing economies such as China are less reliable than data on OECD countries.

The Initial National Communication on Climate Change of the People's Republic of China calculated that carbon dioxide emissions in 2004 had risen to approximately 5.05 billion metric tons, with total greenhouse gas emissions reaching about 6.1 billion metric tons carbon dioxide equivalent.

In 2002, China ranked 2nd (after the United States) in the list of countries by carbon dioxide emissions, with emissions of 3.3 billion metric tons, representing 14.5% of the world total. In 2006, China overtook the US, producing 8% more emissions than the US to become the world's largest emitter of  emissions. However per capita China was ranked 51st in  emissions per capita in 2016, with emissions of 7.2 tonnes per person (compared to 15.5 tonnes per person in the United States). In addition, it has been estimated that around a third of China's carbon emissions in 2005 were due to manufacturing exported goods.

Energy use and carbon emissions by sector
In the industrial sector, six industries – electricity generation, steel, non-ferrous metals, construction materials, oil processing and chemicals – account for nearly 70% of energy use.

In the construction materials sector, China produced about 44% of the world's cement in 2006. Cement production produces more carbon emissions than any other industrial process, accounting for around 4% of global carbon emissions.

National Action Plan on Climate Change
China has been taking action on climate change for some years, with the publication on June 4, 2007, of China's first National Action Plan on Climate Change, and in that year China became the first developing country to publish a national strategy addressing global warming. The plan did not include targets for carbon dioxide emission reductions, but it has been estimated that, if fully implemented, China's annual emissions of greenhouse gases would be reduced by 1.5 billion tons of carbon dioxide equivalent by 2010. Other commentators, however, put the figure at 0.950 billion metric tons.

The publication of the strategy was officially announced during a meeting of the State Council, which called on governments and all sectors of the economy to implement the plan, and for the launch of a public environmental protection awareness campaign.

The National Action Plan includes increasing the proportion of electricity generation from renewable energy sources and from nuclear power, increasing the efficiency of coal-fired power stations, the use of cogeneration, and the development of coal-bed and coal-mine methane.

In addition, the one child policy in China has successfully slowed down the population increase, preventing 300 million births, the equivalent of 1.3 billion tons of  emissions based on average world per capita emissions of 4.2 tons at 2005 level.

12th Five-year Plan 2011–2015
In January 2012, as part of its 12th Five-year Plan, China published a report 12th Five-year Plan on Greenhouse Emission Control (guofa [2011] No. 41), which establishes goals of reducing carbon intensity by 17% by 2015, compared with 2010 levels and raising energy consumption intensity by 16%, relative to GDP. More demanding targets were set for the most developed regions and those with most heavy industry, including Guangdong, Shanghai, Jiangsu, Zhejiang and Tianjin. China also plans to meet 11.4% of its primary energy requirements from non-fossil sources by 2015.

The plan will also pilot the construction of a number of low-carbon Development Zones and low-carbon residential communities, which it hopes will result in a cluster effect among businesses and consumers.

In addition, the Government will in future include data on greenhouse emissions in its official statistics.

Carbon trading scheme
In a separate development, on January 13, 2012, the National Development and Reform Commission announced that the cities of Beijing, Tianjin, Shanghai, Chongqing and Shenzhen, and the provinces of Hubei and Guangdong would become the first to participate in a pilot carbon cap and trade scheme that would operate in a similar way to the European Union Emission Trading Scheme. The development follows an unsuccessful experiment with voluntary carbon exchanges that was set up in 2009 in Beijing, Shanghai and Tianjin.

Fossil fuels

Coal

Coal remains the foundation of the Chinese energy system, covering close to 70 percent of the country's primary energy needs and representing 80 percent of the fuel used in electricity generation. China produces and consumes more coal than any other country. Analysis in 2016 shows that China's coal consumption appears to have peaked in 2014.  According to Global Energy Monitor, China's government has limited the hours of 40% of coal-fired power stations built in 2019, due to overcapacity in electricity generation.

Petroleum

China's oil supply was 4,855 TWh in 2009 which represented 10% of the world's supply.

Although China is still a major crude oil producer, it became an oil importer in the 1990s. China became dependent on imported oil for the first time in its history in 1993 due to demand rising faster than domestic production. In 2002, annual crude petroleum production was 1,298,000,000 barrels, and annual crude petroleum consumption was 1,670,000,000 barrels. In 2006, it imported 145 million tons of crude oil, accounting for 47% of its total oil consumption. By 2014 China was importing approximately 7 mil. barrels of oil per day. Three state-owned oil companies – Sinopec, CNPC, and CNOOC – dominate its domestic market.

China announced on June 20, 2008, plans to raise petrol, diesel and aviation kerosene prices. This decision appeared to reflect a need to reduce the unsustainably high level of subsidies these fuels attract, given the global trend in the price of oil.

Top oil producers were in 2010: Russia 502 Mt (13%), Saudi Arabia 471 Mt (12%), US 336 Mt (8%), Iran 227 Mt (6%), China 200 Mt (5%), Canada 159 Mt (4%), Mexico 144 Mt (4%), UAE 129 Mt (3%). The world oil production increased from 2005 to 2010 1.3% and from 2009 to 2010 3.4%.

Natural gas

China's natural gas supply was 1,015 TWh in 2009 that was 3% of the world supply.

CNPC, Sinopec, and CNOOC are all active in the upstream gas sector, as well as in LNG import, and in midstream pipelines. Branch pipelines and urban networks are run by city gas companies including China Gas Holdings, ENN Energy, Towngas China, Beijing Enterprises Holdings and Kunlun Energy.

China was top seventh in natural gas production in 2010.

Issued by China's State Council in September 2013, China's Action Plan for the Prevention and Control of Air Pollution illustrates government desire to increase the share of natural gas in China's energy mix. In May 2014 China signed a 30-year deal with Russia to deliver 38 billion cubic metres of natural gas each year. The Power of Siberia pipeline is designed to reduce China's dependence on coal, which is more carbon intensive and causes more pollution than natural gas. The proposed western gas route from Russia's West Siberian petroleum basin to North-Western China is known as Power of Siberia 2.

In November 2021, U.S. producer Venture Global LNG signed a twenty-year contract with China's state-owned Sinopec to supply liquefied natural gas (LNG). China's imports of U.S. natural gas would more than double.

Electricity generation

In 2013, China's total annual electricity output was 5.398 trillion kWh and the annual consumption was 5.380 trillion kWh with an installed capacity of 1247 GW (all the largest in the world).

This is an increase from 2009, when China's total annual electricity output was 3.71465 trillion kWh, and the annual consumption was 3.6430 trillion kWh (second largest in the world). In the same year, the total installed electricity generating capacity was 874 GW. China is undertaking substantial long-distance transmission projects with record breaking capacities, and has the goal of achieving an integrated nationwide grid in the period between 2015 and 2020.

Coal

In 2015, China generated 73% of its electricity from coal-fired power stations, which has been dropping from a peak of 81% in 2007.

In recent years, China has increased its use of coal power and continued to build new coal power plants. The National Energy Administration's early warning risk rating for coal plants approved the establishment of new power plants in 2020. China shut down roughly 7GW of power plants at the same time, continuing to decommission ageing coal-fired power reactors.

Renewables

China is the world's leading renewable energy producer, with an installed capacity of 152 GW. China has been investing heavily in the renewable energy field in recent years. In 2007, the total renewable energy investment was US$12 billion, second only to Germany. In 2012, China invested US$65.1 billion in clean energy (20% more than in 2011), fully 30% of the total investment by the G-20, including 25% (US$31.2 billion) of global solar energy investment, 37% percent (US$27.2 billion) of global wind energy investment, and 47% (US$6.3 billion) of global investment in "other renewable energy" (small hydro, geothermal, marine, and biomass); 23 GW of clean generation capacity was installed.

China is also the largest producer of wind turbines and solar panels. Approximately 7% of China's energy was from renewable sources in 2006, a figure targeted to rise to 10% by 2010 and to 16% by 2020. The major renewable energy source in China is hydropower. Total hydro-electric output in China in 2009 was 615.64 TWh, constituting 16.6% of all electricity generated. The country already has the most hydro-electric capacity in the world, and the Three Gorges Dam is currently the largest hydro-electric power station in the world, with a total capacity of 22.5 GW. It has been in full operation since May 2012.

Nuclear power

In 2012, China had 15 nuclear power units with a total electric capacity of 11 GW and total output of 54.8 billion kWh, accounting for 1.9% country's total electricity output. This rose to 17 reactors in 2013. By 2016 the number of operating nuclear reactors was 32 with 22 under construction and other dozen to start construction this year. There are plans to increase nuclear power capacity and nuclear power percentage, bringing the total electricity output to 86 GW and 4% respectively by 2020. Plans are to increase this to 200 GWe by 2030, and 400 GWe by 2050. China has set an end-of-the-Century goal 1500GWs of nuclear energy, most of this from fast reactors. China has 32 reactors under construction, the highest number in the world.

Rural electrification
Following the completion of the similar Township Electrification Program in 2005, the Village Electrification Program plans to provide renewable electricity to 3.5 million households in 10,000 villages by 2010. This is to be followed by full rural electrification using renewable energy by 2015.

Renewable energy sources

Although a majority of the renewable energy in China is from hydropower, other renewable energy sources are in rapid development. In 2006, a total of 10 billion US dollars had been invested in renewable energy, second only to Germany.

Bioenergy

In 2006, 16 million tons of corn have been used to produce a first generation biofuel (ethanol). However, because food prices in China rose sharply during 2007, China has decided to ban the further expansion of the corn ethanol industry.

On February 7, a spokesman for the State Forestry Administration announced that  would be devoted to biofuel production. Under an agreement reached with PetroChina in January 2007, 400 square kilometres of Jatropha curcas is to be grown for biodiesel production. Local governments are also developing oilseed projects. There were concerns that such developments may lead to environmental damage.

In 2018, The Telegraph reported that the biofuel industry is further on the rise. There also seems to be considerable interest in biofuels (i.e. biodiesel, green jet fuel, ...)  which use waste material as the input source (second generation biofuel).

Solar power

China has become the world's largest consumer of solar energy. It is the largest producer of solar water heaters, accounting for 60 percent of the world's solar hot water heating capacity, and the total installed heaters is estimated at 30 million households. Solar PV production in China is also in rapid development. In 2007, 0.82 GW of Solar PV was produced, second only to Japan.

As part of the stimulus plan of "Golden Sun", announced by the government in 2009, several developments and projects became part of the milestones for the development of solar technology in China. These include the agreement signed by LDK for a 500MW solar project, a new thin film solar plant developed by Anwell Technologies in Henan province using its own proprietary solar technology and the solar power plant project in a desert, headed by First Solar and Ordos City. The effort to drive the renewable energy use in China was further assured after the speech by the Chinese President, given at the UN climate summit on 22 Sept 2009 in New York, pledging that China will plan to have 15% of its energy from renewable sources within a decade. China is using solar power in houses, buildings, and cars.

Wind power

China's total wind power capacity reached 2.67 gigawatts (GW) in 2006 and 44.7 GW by 2010. This figure reached 281 GW in 2020, an increase of 71.6 GW on the previous year.

Energy conservation

General work plan
Officials were warned that violating energy conservation and environmental protection laws would lead to criminal proceedings, while failure to achieve targets would be taken into account in the performance assessment of officials and business leaders.

After achieving less than half the 4% reduction in energy intensity targeted for 2006, all companies and local and national government were asked to submit detailed plans for compliance before June 30, 2007.

During the first four years of the plan, energy intensity improved by 14.4%, but dropped sharply in the first quarter of 2010. In August 2010, China announced the closing of 2,087 steel mills, cement works and other energy-intensive factories by September 30, 2010. The factory closings were made more palatable by a labor shortage in much of China making it easier for workers to find other jobs.

Space heating and air conditioning
A State Council circular issued on June 3, 2007, restricts the temperature of air conditioning in public buildings to no lower than 26 °C in summer (78.8 °F), and of heating to no higher than 20 °C (68 °F) in winter. The sale of inefficient air conditioning units has also been outlawed.

Businesspeople 
Chinese billionaires in energy business by Forbes included in 2013 Wang Yusuo & family ($2.4 B) the chairman of ENN Group, one of China's largest non-government-controlled energy businesses and Huo Qinghua ( $1.1 B) chairman of China Kingho Energy Group, one of the country's largest privately held mining and energy companies, with operations in China, Africa and Mongolia. and in Hong Kong Sit Kwong Lam ($1.35 B) the founder and chairman of Hong Kong-listed Brightoil Petroleum.

Public opinion
The Chinese results from the 1st Annual World Environment Review, published on June 5, 2007, revealed that, in a sample of 1024 people (50% male):

88% are concerned about climate change.
97% think their Government should do more to tackle global warming.
63% think that China is too dependent on fossil fuels.
56% think that China is too reliant on foreign oil.
91% think that a minimum 25% of electricity should be generated from renewable energy sources.
61% are concerned about nuclear power.
79% are concerned about carbon dioxide emissions from developing countries.
62% think it appropriate for developed countries to demand restrictions on carbon dioxide emissions from developing countries.

Another survey published in August 2007 by China Youth Daily and the British Council sampled 2,500 Chinese people with an average age of 30.1. It showed that 80% of young Chinese are concerned about global warming.

Protests 
In December 2011 in Haimen, Guangdong, a coastal town of about 120,000 people, residents have protested ongoing for three days (22.12.2011) against plans for another coal-fired power plant. Police were armed with batons and shields and fired teargas to break up demonstrations.

See also

Climate change in China
China Energy Conservation Investment Corporation
Environment of China
Electricity sector in China
List of power stations in China
Low-carbon economy
Peak oil
Pollution in China
Renewable energy in China
Wind power in China
Solar power in China
Nuclear power in China
Economics of nuclear power plants
List of countries by energy consumption and production
World energy consumption
:Category:Energy by country

References

External links
China Energy Investment Network
China Energy Conservation Association
National Action Plan on Climate Change—National Development and Reform Commission
China Clean Energy Program—An initiative of the Natural Resources Defense Council, in close partnership with China's South North Institute on Sustainable Development.
Cleaner Production in China—Current and comprehensive information source on China's campaign to reduce pollution.
China-US Energy Efficiency Alliance: News & Resources
A Sustainable China Energy Outlook-A report produced by Greenpeace and the European Renewable Energy Council (EREC)
 China Energy Statistical Yearbook 2016

 
China
China
Science and technology in the People's Republic of China